The Daily Observer is an English-language newspaper in Bangladesh. The founding editor is Iqbal Sobhan Chowdhury, who was formerly editor of The Bangladesh Observer.

History

The Daily Observer hit the stands in Bangladesh on 1 February 2011.  Iqbal Sobhan Chowdhury, the last editor of Bangladesh Observer, started the circulation of a new newspaper by the name of The Daily Observer in 2011.

The editor was sued by MP Nizam Uddin Hazari in 2017 for publishing an allegedly defamatory article mentioning him.

See also
 List of newspapers in Bangladesh
 The Daily Star (Bangladesh)
 Dhaka Tribune
 Prothom-alo

References

Publications established in 2011
Newspapers published in Dhaka
2011 establishments in Bangladesh
English-language newspapers published in Bangladesh
Daily newspapers published in Bangladesh